Deontay Wilder vs. Dominic Breazeale was a professional boxing match between former WBC heavyweight champion, Deontay Wilder, and heavyweight boxer, Dominic Breazeale.

The bout took place May 18, 2019, at the Barclays Center in Brooklyn, New York City.

Background
On the evening of May 18, 2019, Wilder defended his WBC heavyweight title against mandatory challenger Dominic Breazeale, who was ranked #4 by the WBC, via knockout with 43 seconds left in the first round. Wilder caught him with a powerful right which sent Breazeale flat on his back and unable to continue with the referee waving off the contest after reaching the ten count.

Prior to the fight, Wilder had again made controversial comments about wanting to kill an opponent in the ring, saying he was "trying to get a body on my record", and that "[boxing] is the only sport where you can kill a man and get paid for it at the same time." This was not the first time Wilder had alluded to killing an opponent, having made similar remarks previously in 2017 about Bermane Stiverne. However, despite the pre-fight animosity, the two men reconciled after the fight's conclusion, with Wilder saying "I've told him [Breazeale] I love him and I want to see him go home to his family".

The fight
Breazeale faced WBC Heavyweight Champion Deontay Wilder and was knocked out in the first round. Wilder caught him with a powerful right which sent Breazeale's head onto the canvas and his body flat on his back and unable to continue with the referee waving off the contest after reaching the ten count. This marked his second ever professional loss.

Fight card

References

Boxing matches in New York City
May 2019 events in the United States
World Boxing Council heavyweight championship matches